These are the official results of the Women's Cross-Country Mountain Biking at the 2000 Summer Olympics in Sydney, Australia. The event was 35.5 kilometres in length and was held on 23 September 2000 at the Fairfield City Farm. There were 30 participants, one of whom did not finish the event.

Medalists

Final classification

See also
 Men's Cross Country Race

References

External links
 Official Report

Cycling at the 2000 Summer Olympics
2000 Women
Olym
Women's events at the 2000 Summer Olympics